Bragason is a surname. Notable people with the surname include:

Fjölnir Geir Bragason (1965–2021), Icelandic tattoo artist
Ragnar Bragason (born 1971), Icelandic film director, screenwriter, and producer
Sigurður Bragason (born 1954), Icelandic baritone

Icelandic-language surnames